Juewei Food, operating as Juewei Duck Neck in China and King of Braise in Singapore, is a retail snack chain with annual retail sales of RMB5.8 billion in 2015. Its headquarters are in Changsha, Hunan. As of 2021, the company has over 10,000 stores worldwide, .

Duck neck is its specialty food. Its products consist of mainly braised duck parts or vegetables with specialty flavours such as mala, sweet and spicy, dark soy sauce and five spice.

History
It was established in 2006; previously the company name was Changsha Jueweixuan Business Management Corporation and it was headquartered in Changsha. In 2011 a consortium invested 260 million renminbi (US$40 million) in Juewei Duck Neck. This consortium included Fosun Group and Kunwu Jiuding Capital Co., Ltd.

References

External links

 Official website 
 Juewei Food 
 Juewei King of Braise

Fast-food chains of China
Companies based in Changsha
Retail companies established in 2006
Restaurants established in 2006
2006 establishments in China
Fast-food poultry restaurants